Eudoxa is a Swedish think tank, formed in 2000.  Eudoxa has a transhumanist, and liberal political profile, with a focus on promoting dynamism, emerging technologies, harm reduction policy and discussing the challenges of the environment and the future. It is independent from political parties and other political and religious interest groups.

Eudoxa organizes seminars and conferences about these subjects, produces reports for corporations and organizations and promotes public debate.

It has a staff consisting both of scientist and humanists, in order to bridge the rift between The Two Cultures on evaluating the effects of emerging technologies, and give a better analysis. Its intellectual inspiration derives much from the book The Future and Its Enemies by Virginia Postrel.

Eudoxa has discussed biotechnology, harm reduction, health care, nanotechnology, RFID, and intellectual property.

Eudoxa is the Swedish partner in the International Property Rights Index.

The think tank currently consists of: Waldemar Ingdahl, Alexander Sanchez, and Anders Sandberg.

According to the 2014 Global Go To Think Tank Index Report (Think Tanks and Civil Societies Program, University of Pennsylvania), Eudoxa is rated number 25 (of 45) in the "Top Science and Technology Think Tanks" of the world.

The think tank was closed in 2016

References

External links
 Eudoxa

Political and economic think tanks based in Europe
Politics of Sweden
2000 establishments in Sweden
Radio-frequency identification
Science and technology think tanks
Libertarian think tanks
Think tanks based in Sweden
Libertarianism in Sweden
Think tanks established in 2000